Henry Nelson Walker (November 30, 1811 – February 24, 1886) was a Michigan politician.

Early life
Walker was born on November 30, 1811, in Fredonia, New York, to John and Nancy Walker. Walker moved to Detroit in 1835.

Career
In Fredonia, New York, Walker graduated from an academy, and then started to practice law. On November 6, 1843, Walker was elected as a member of the Michigan House of Representatives from the Wayne County district. He served in this position in 1844. Walker served as Michigan Attorney General from 1845 to 1847. Walker served as the postmaster of Detroit from 1859 to 1860.

Personal life
Walker was married to Emily Virginia Norvell, daughter of United States Senator John Norvell. Together, they had three children. Walker was Episcopalian.

Death
Walker died on February 24, 1886, in Detroit. He was interred at Elmwood Cemetery.

References

1811 births
1886 deaths
Michigan postmasters
Episcopalians from Michigan
19th-century American Episcopalians
Michigan Attorneys General
Democratic Party members of the Michigan House of Representatives
19th-century American politicians
19th-century American lawyers
Burials at Elmwood Cemetery (Detroit)